The Cargill Monument is a notable public monument in central Dunedin, New Zealand.

The monument was designed by Charles Robert Swyer and built in 1863–64, using Tasmanian sandstone, on a base of locally sourced phonolite. The design, in Gothic Revival style, was likely partly inspired by Edinburgh's Scott Monument, and features delicate carved lacework and grotesques. Its design was compared by contemporary architect Nathaniel Wales to that of England's Eleanor crosses. The design also originally featured drinking fountains, but they have been unused for many years.

The monument was originally located in the city's centre, The Octagon, and was surrounded with railings, but it was moved to its current site (sans railings) in The Exchange in 1872. It now stands at the corner of Princes Street and Rattray Street on John Wickliffe Plaza.

A plaque at the foot of the monument marks the location of the first Salvation Army meeting in New Zealand, held at the site in April 1883.

The Cargill Monument is Category I listed in the register of Heritage New Zealand.

Notes

References

External links
Otago Taphophile - a collection of newspaper reports about the monument, from 1864 to 1949.

Buildings and structures in Dunedin
Outdoor sculptures in New Zealand
Tourist attractions in Dunedin
1863 sculptures
Gothic Revival architecture in New Zealand
Heritage New Zealand Category 1 historic places in Otago
Cargill family (New Zealand)
Central Dunedin